The Freedom Caucus, also known as the House Freedom Caucus, is a congressional caucus consisting of Republican members of the United States House of Representatives. It is generally considered to be the most conservative and farthest-right bloc within the House Republican Conference. The caucus was formed in January 2015 by a group of conservatives and Tea Party movement members, with the aim of pushing the Republican leadership to the right. Its first chairman, Jim Jordan, described the caucus as a "smaller, more cohesive, more agile and more active" group of conservative representatives.

The caucus is positioned right-wing to far-right on the political spectrum, with some members holding right-wing populist beliefs, such as opposition to immigration reform. The group takes hardline conservative positions and favors social conservativism and small government. The group sought dozens of times to repeal the Affordable Care Act. Established as an ultra-conservative alternative to the Republican Study Committee, the group initially emphasized fiscal conservatism and concerns about House rules, favoring budget cuts and a decentralization of power within the House of Representatives. Later, the Freedom Caucus shifted its emphasis to loyalty to Donald Trump and became what Politico described as  "more populist and nationalist, but less bound by policy principles". The caucus includes some members who are libertarians. The caucus supports House candidates through its PAC, the House Freedom Fund.

History 
The caucus originated during the mid-January 2015 Republican congressional retreat in Hershey, Pennsylvania. According to founding member Mick Mulvaney, "that was the first time we got together and decided we were a group, and not just a bunch of pissed-off guys". Nine conservative Republican members of the House began planning a new congressional caucus separate from the Republican Study Committee and apart from the House Republican Conference. The founding members who constituted the first board of directors for the new caucus were Republican representatives Scott Garrett of New Jersey, Jim Jordan of Ohio, John Fleming of Louisiana, Matt Salmon of Arizona, Justin Amash of Michigan, Raúl Labrador of Idaho, Mulvaney of South Carolina, Ron DeSantis of Florida and Mark Meadows of North Carolina.

Mick Mulvaney told Ryan Lizza of the New Yorker, "We had twenty names, and all of them were terrible. None of us liked the Freedom Caucus, either, but it was so generic and so universally awful that we had no reason to be against it." According to Lizza, "one of the working titles for the group was the Reasonable Nutjob Caucus."

During the crisis over the funding of the Department of Homeland Security in early 2015, the caucus offered four plans for resolution, but all were rejected by the Republican leadership. One of the caucus leaders, Raúl Labrador, said the caucus would offer an alternative that the most conservative Republican members could support.

Opposition to Speaker of the House John Boehner 
The newly formed group declared that a criterion for new members in the group would be opposition to John Boehner as Speaker of the House and willingness to vote against or thwart him on legislation that the group opposed.

The House Freedom Caucus was involved in the resignation of Boehner on September 25, 2015, and the ensuing leadership battle for the new speaker. Members of the caucus who had voted against Boehner for speaker felt unfairly punished, accusing him of cutting them off from positions in the Republican Study Committee and depriving them of key committee assignments. Boehner found it increasingly difficult to manage House Republicans with the fierce opposition of conservative members of the Republican Party in the House, and he sparred with those House Republicans in 2013 over their willingness to shut down the government in pursuit of goals such as repealing the Affordable Care Act. These Republicans later created and became members of the Freedom Caucus when it was created in 2015.

After Boehner resigned as speaker, Kevin McCarthy, the House majority leader, was initially the lead contender to succeed him, but the Freedom Caucus withheld its support. However, McCarthy withdrew from the race on October 8, 2015, after appearing to suggest that the Benghazi investigation's purpose had been to lower the approval ratings of Hillary Clinton. On the same day as McCarthy's withdrawal, Reid Ribble resigned from the Freedom Caucus saying he had joined to promote certain policies and could not support the role that it was playing in the leadership race.

On October 20, 2015, Paul Ryan announced that his bid for the speaker of the United States House of Representatives was contingent on an official endorsement by the Freedom Caucus. While the group could not reach the 80% approval that was needed to give an official endorsement, on October 21, 2015, it announced that it had reached a supermajority support for Ryan. On October 29, 2015, Ryan succeeded Boehner as the speaker of the House.

On October 30, 2017, Vanity Fair published an interview with Boehner, who said of the Freedom Caucus: "They can't tell you what they're for. They can tell you everything they're against. They're anarchists. They want total chaos. Tear it all down and start over. That's where their mindset is."

Backlash in 2016 
The group faced backlash from the Republican Party establishment during the 2016 election cycle. One of its members, Congressman Tim Huelskamp, a Tea Party Republican representing Kansas' First District, was defeated during a primary election on August 2, 2016, by Roger Marshall.

During Trump administration

Following the election of Donald Trump, Mulvaney said "Trump wants to turn Washington upside down – that was his first message and his winning message. We want the exact same thing. To the extent that he's got to convince Republicans to change Washington, we're there to help him ... and I think that makes us Donald Trump's best allies in the House." Freedom Caucus vice chair Jim Jordan said that during the Trump administration, the Freedom Caucus shifted focus from passing legislation to defending the President.

Rejection of American Health Care Act in 2017 
On March 24, 2017, the American Health Care Act (AHCA), the House Republican bill to repeal and replace the Affordable Care Act, was withdrawn by Republican House Speaker Paul Ryan because it lacked the votes to pass, due in large part to opposition from Freedom Caucus Republicans who believed that the replacement provisions had the effect of failing to repeal some elements of the original Affordable Care Act.

Two days later, President Donald Trump publicly criticized the Freedom Caucus and other right-wing groups, such as the Club for Growth and Heritage Action, that opposed the bill. Trump tweeted: "Democrats are smiling in D.C. that the Freedom Caucus, with the help of Club For Growth and Heritage, have saved Planned Parenthood & Obamacare!" On the same day, Congressman Ted Poe of Texas resigned from the Freedom Caucus. On March 30, 2017, Trump "declared war" on the Freedom Caucus, sending a tweet urging Republicans to "fight them" in the 2018 midterm elections "if they don’t get on the team" (i.e., support Trump's proposals). Vocal Freedom Caucus member Justin Amash responded by accusing Trump of "succumb[ing] to the D.C. Establishment."

Trump later developed a closer relationship with the caucus chair, Mark Meadows. In April 2018, Trump described three caucus membersMeadows, Jim Jordan, and Ron DeSantisas "absolute warriors" for their defense of him during the course of the Special Counsel investigation.

During first impeachment of Trump 
In May 2019, the Freedom Caucus officially condemned one of its founding members, Justin Amash, after he called for the impeachment of President Trump over the Trump–Ukraine scandal. Amash, an outspoken libertarian, announced in June 2019 that he had left the caucus; later the same year, he left the Republican Party and joined the Libertarian Party.

During the impeachment inquiry against Trump, and subsequent first impeachment of Trump, the caucus emerged as a chief defender of Trump during the proceedings.

Meadows' appointment as WH chief of staff and Liz Cheney criticism 
In March 2020, former Freedom Caucus chair Mark Meadows was appointed as White House chief of staff, replacing Mick Mulvaney, who was also a founding member of the Freedom Caucus.

Freedom Caucus members have called on Liz Cheney to resign as Chair of the House Republican Conference, due to her vocal criticism of Trump's foreign policy, response to the COVID-19 pandemic, and use of social media, leading to her firing May 12, 2021, and replacement by Elise Stefanik two days later.

2020 National Defense Authorization Act 
In December 2020, the caucus sided with Donald Trump and opposed the NDAA on the grounds that it did not include a provision to repeal Section 230.

Role in attempting to overturn 2020 election and opposition to second Trump impeachment
After Trump lost the his bid for reelection in November 2020, many members of the Freedom Caucus supported Trump's attempt to overturn the election results. In early December 2020, amid pressure from Trump on congressional Republicans to help him subvert the election outcome, two dozen House Republicans, including many Freedom Caucus members, sent a letter to Trump asking him to order his Attorney General, William P. Barr, to appoint a Justice Department special counsel to investigate supposed election "irregularities," even though Barr had previously acknowledged that there was no evidence justifying such a step.Rachael Bade, Josh Dawsey & Tom Hamburger, Trump pressures congressional Republicans to help in his fight to overturn the election, Washington Post (December 10, 2020). Several Freedom Caucus members met with officials at Trump's White House in December 2020, discussing ways to overturn the election results during the 2021 United States Electoral College vote count. Most Freedom Caucus members objected to the counting of the electoral votes that formalized Trump's defeat. During the second impeachment of Donald Trump for incitement of insurrection, Freedom Caucus leadership and members demanded that Representative Liz Cheney, one of 10 Republicans who voted in favor of impeachment, resign from her role as chairwoman of the House Republican Conference.Mike DeBonis, Josh Dawsey & Seung Min Kim, Several senior Republicans join impeachment push, Washington Post (January 13, 2021).Catie Edmondson, Cheney facing internal backlash for impeachment vote as Republican rifts deepen over Trump., New York Times (January 14, 2021).

2021–present

America First Caucus and MAGA Squad 
In April 2021, a faction within the Freedom Caucus, led by Paul Gosar and Marjorie Taylor Greene, attempted to form a new splinter group called the 'America First Caucus', along with Matt Gaetz. Senior members of the Freedom Caucus reportedly reacted with "fury" to the proposal, with Ken Buck publicly denouncing it. The new caucus was later scrapped.

Later, a faction emerged of Trump loyalists within the Freedom Caucus known as the 'MAGA Squad', which included Gosar, Greene, Gaetz, Madison Cawthorn, Louie Gohmert, Mo Brooks, Andy Biggs, Scott Perry and Lauren Boebert. It was "not a formal caucus", but was described as more radical than the mainstream Freedom Caucus. The group supported primary challenges against incumbent Republicans during the 2022 United States House of Representatives elections.

State Freedom Caucus Network 
In December 2021, the Freedom Caucus officially expanded to the state level, establishing the 'State Freedom Caucus Network' in state legislatures to provide legislators with additional resources. The group has state-level caucuses in ten states: Arizona, Idaho, Georgia, South Carolina, Mississippi, South Dakota, Montana, Wyoming, Pennsylvania and Illinois.

Aside from the caucuses affiliated with the State Freedom Caucus Network, several state-level caucuses describing themselves as the 'Freedom Caucus' exist in other state legislatures, including in Texas, New Hampshire, North Carolina, Georgia, Washington and Michigan.

Respect for Marriage Act 
In July 2022, the caucus split over the Respect for Marriage Act, which recognized a statutory right to same-sex marriage. Chairman Scott Perry (R-PA) joined 46 other Republicans (as well as all Democrats) in voting for the bill, (Perry later voted against final passage of the bill) but the rest of the Freedom Caucus opposed it, adopting a formal position urging Senate Republicans to block the bill. To take a formal position on legislation, the Freedom Caucus requires the support of 80% of the caucus's members.

118th Congress House Republican leadership elections (2023) 

In the November 2022 elections, Republicans narrowly regained control of the House of Representatives that opens in January 2023. The Freedom Caucus was actively involved in the ensuing House Republican leadership elections, but was divided over whether to challenge House Minority Leader Kevin McCarthy's bid to be Speaker of the House of Representatives. Before the internal House Republican election, the caucus issued an array of demands that would fundamentally change House procedure by weakening the power of the speaker and strengthening the power of both the caucus and rank-and-file House Republicans as a whole. These included making it easier to oust a speaker by reviving the motion to vacate the chair; allowing 10% of the Republican conference to force a vote on any amendment, thus reducing the speaker's control over legislation; and codifying the Hastert rule ("majority-of-the-majority" rule), which would block all legislation except those supported by a majority of House Republicans.

Former caucus chair Andy Biggs launched a challenge to McCarthy, but McCarthy earned the Republican nomination for speaker, by defeating Biggs in a 188–31 secret ballot vote, with an additional five Republicans writing in other names. McCarthy ran with the endorsement of other Freedom Caucus members, such as vice chair Jim Jordan, David Schweikert, and Marjorie Taylor Greene. Caucus member Byron Donalds also ran for House Republican Conference chair, but lost to incumbent Elise Stefanik, while member Andrew Clyde ran for House Republican Conference secretary, but lost to Lisa McClain.

McCarthy needed 218 votes from the House floor to be elected speaker in the January 3, 2023 vote. After winning the internal Republican nomination, some Freedom Caucus members became outspoken supporters of McCarthy, including Jordan, a former McCarthy rival who was set to be chairman of the House Judiciary Committee. Taylor Greene also backed McCarthy, saying that any alternative to McCarthy would be insufficiently right-wing. Other caucus members resisted supporting McCarthy, with five members saying they would vote against him, although they have not coalesced around a specific alternative candidate. A third group of caucus members did not publicly support or oppose McCarthy's speakership bid, seeking to extract concessions from him. Because the House Republicans only have a narrow majority (222–212), McCarthy could not gain a majority unless nearly all Republicans voted for him. McCarthy warned his internal opponents that the next speaker of the House could be chosen with House Democratic votes if the Republican caucus failed to unite around him. In December 2022, seven hardline Republicans, including Freedom Caucus chairman Scott Perry and several members of the caucus, issued a letter demanding certain commitments from a speaker; the letter repeated many demands that the group had made in summer 2022, including securing an increase in Freedom Caucus representation in committee chairmanships and in the House Rules Committee; barring the House Republican leadership and House Republican leadership PACs from getting involved in primaries (as McCarthy has done); and restoring the motion to vacate the chair. In January 2023, 19 Freedom Caucus members voted against McCarthy during the House floor vote for Speaker, eventually allowing McCarthy to become Speaker only after he had agreed to make extensive House rules concessions to the rebels.

Leadership 
The current Chair of the caucus is Representative Scott Perry from Pennsylvania, with Representative Jim Jordan as the Deputy Chair. In January 2022, Representative Lauren Boebert was elected as Communications Chair, Representative Warren Davidson as Whip, and Representative Chip Roy as Policy Chair.

Membership

Membership policy 
The House Freedom Caucus does not disclose the names of its members and membership is by invitation only. The New York Times wrote in October 2015 that the caucus usually meets "in the basement of a local pub rather than at the Capitol". The caucus acts as a bloc, with decisions that are supported by 80 percent made binding on all of its members, which has strengthened its influence among House Republicans.

Historical membership 
As the HFC does not publicize a full membership list, the known number of members at the start of each electoral cycle is listed below.

Current members 
A number of members have identified themselves, or have been identified by others, as belonging to the Freedom Caucus. There are at least 46 caucus members ; those members include:

Former members

See also 
 Blue Dog Coalition
 Caucuses of the United States Congress
 Factions in the Republican Party (United States)
 Liberty Caucus
 Republican Liberty Caucus
 Republican Main Street Partnership
 Second Amendment Caucus
 
 Tea Party Caucus
 Tuesday Group

Further reading 
 Green, Matthew (2019). Legislative Hardball: The House Freedom Caucus and the Power of Threat-Making in Congress. Cambridge: Cambridge University Press.

References

External links 
 
 
 

2015 in American politics
Organizations established in 2015
Conservative organizations in the United States
Factions in the Republican Party (United States)
Far-right organizations in the United States
Libertarianism in the United States
Ideological caucuses of the United States Congress
Political organizations based in the United States
Republican Party (United States)
Republican Party (United States) organizations
Tea Party movement
Trumpism
2015 establishments in Washington, D.C.